Thompson Barnett House, also known as the Barnett-Schafer House, is a historic home located in Clay Township, Cass County, Indiana. It was erected about 1854, and is a two-story, five bay, Greek Revival style brick dwelling.  It has a side gable roof and -story gabled brick ell added about 1870.

It was listed on the National Register of Historic Places in 1986.

References

Houses on the National Register of Historic Places in Indiana
Greek Revival houses in Indiana
Houses completed in 1854
Houses in Cass County, Indiana
National Register of Historic Places in Cass County, Indiana